College Hill Historic District may refer to:

 College Hill Historic District (Scottsboro, Alabama), listed on the NRHP in Alabama
 College Hill District, Bowling Green, KY, listed on the NRHP in Kentucky
 College Hill Historic District (Bowling Green, Kentucky), listed on the NRHP in Kentucky
 College Hill Historic District (Crete, Nebraska), listed on the NRHP in Nebraska
 College Hill Historic District (Greensboro, North Carolina), listed on the NRHP in North Carolina
 College Hill West Historic District, Corvallis, OR, listed on the NRHP in Oregon
 College Hill Residential Historic District, Easton, PA, listed on the NRHP in Pennsylvania
 College Hill Historic District (Providence, Rhode Island), listed on the NRHP in Rhode Island
 College Hill Historic District (Brownsville, Tennessee), listed on the NRHP in Tennessee
 College Hill Historic District (Maryville, Tennessee), listed on the National Register as the Indiana Avenue Historic District
 College Hill Historic District (Pullman, Washington), listed on the NRHP in Washington
 College Hills Historic District, Shorewood Hills, WI, listed on the NRHP in Wisconsin

See also
College Hill (disambiguation)